Eduardo Vélez may refer to:

Eduardo Vélez (archer) (born 1986), Mexican Olympic archer
Eduardo Vélez (tennis) (born 1969), Mexican tennis player